Barbelith was an online forum, named after an element in the comic book series The Invisibles by Grant Morrison, initially conceived of as a space for the discussion of Morrison's works.

The Invisibles

In The Invisibles, Barbelith is the name of the "placenta" for humanity; a satellite-like object located on the dark side of the moon. It recurs throughout the story as a supernatural moon seeming both intelligent and benign. Barbelith's role is like that of a placenta in that it connects the hologram of our subjective reality to the realm outside of our space-time, the domain of the magic mirror, and helps humans to realize their true nature beyond the subjective concept of "self".

Prior to contact with Barbelith, most characters undergo some sort of trauma or intensity- an alien abduction or shamanic initiation, for example. A sort of cosmic "stoplight" is also present in some instances, though also seems to precede any sort of contact with the "healthy" dimension of The Invisibles binary-based paradigm; the realm of the Invisible College.

The word first appeared on a sign post in House of Heart's Desire, a short story published in 1989 within the pages of A1, with art by Dom Regan. It has also cropped up in other comics Morrison has written. Doom Patrol #54 in particular goes into more detail.

Grant Morrison describes its origins as follows: "The word 'BARBELiTH' is derived from a dream I had when I was about 20 or 21 and coincided with my first structured 'magical' experiences and a minor nervous breakdown (in the dream, BARBELiTH was the name of some higher dimension or alternate reality)."

Barbelith is inspired by the Philip K. Dick novel VALIS in which the titular satellite, VALIS, appears as a sort of Gnostic information-satellite for humanity.

Perhaps of note, in Sethian gnosticism, the name of the first and highest emanation of the true God (as opposed to their description of the God of the Old Testament as Ialdabaoth or the demiurge) is called Barbelo.

The forum

The forum was originally named The Nexus, created in 1998 as a part of The Invisibles annotation site The Bomb. Over time, topics of discussion moved beyond the comic book, especially after the series came to an end in 2000. As the forum's subject matter expanded, it was renamed Barbelith Underground and eventually moved to the front page of the barbelith.com domain. It was run by Tom Coates and its code was written by Cal Henderson.

Unlike other online communities, moderation actions (such as editing or deleting posts or topics) were done through "distributed moderation": the code established a voting system in which more than one moderator had to agree before a change took place. In Tom Coates' words: "Communities are hard-work to maintain, prone to spats and arguments, can spiral out of control and don't always want to move in the same direction as the people who consider themselves 'in charge'. Distributing the power rather more creates the opportunity to help the community define itself."

Its sub-forums were: 
Conversation ("For off-topic discussion, introductions and chatting"), 
Policy & Help ("Board policy, technical errors & problems about trolls"), 
Head Shop ("Philosophy, Cultural Studies and Identity Politics"), 
Laboratory ("New technologies, pure science, medicine and medical ethics), 
Switchboard ("Politics, activism and current affairs"),
Temple ("Faith, magic and mysticism, bodywork, and applied psychology"), 
Art, Fashion and Design ("Fine art, high fashion, product and graphic design"), 
Books, Criticism & Writing ("Novels, periodicals, short stories and the literary world"); 
Comic Books ("Graphic Novels and Comics - superheroes to social-commentary"); 
Film, TV & Theatre ("Movies, Television and on the stage"); 
Games & Gameplay ("Videogames, board games, RPGs, sport - the mechanics of play"); 
Radio & Music ("From Bowie to Britney, punk to Daft Punk"); 
Creation ("Collaborative or individual creative projects")
Gathering ("Organising gatherings - unlawful or otherwise").

The forum served as the origin point of Jenny Everywhere, the first open-source comic character.

As of the beginning of 2012 there was little activity from remaining members on the board. This was largely due to the closure of the board to new admissions. Increasing fear of "trolls", and the fact that one person had sole responsibility for the board, led to a prolonged period of decline in new material and membership.

References

External links
 The Barbelith Online Community
 Barbelith's Wiki entry on the word and they also have a page What does Barbelith mean?
 "The Bomb", Invisibles annotations site
 House of Hearts Desire

Fictional deities
Entertainment Internet forums